Ryohei Machiya is a Japanese novelist. He won the Akutagawa Prize for his boxing novel Ichi Raundo Ippun Sanju-yon Byo (1 round 1 minute 34 seconds).

Early life 
Ryohei Machiya was born in 1983 in Taito-ku, Tokyo, and attended the Saitama Prefectural Koshigaya High School.

References

Japanese novelists
Living people
Year of birth missing (living people)